Emile Zola Berman (November 3, 1902 – July 3, 1981) was an American criminal defense lawyer. He was named after the French novelist Émile Zola (1840–1902). During World War II he was an intelligence officer in the 10th Air Force in Burma where he received the Distinguished Flying Cross and the Bronze Star. He was discharged as a lieutenant colonel.

Famous cases
Berman first became nationally known in 1956 when he defended Staff Sergeant Matthew McKeon who was accused of manslaughter after leading men into a creek during a training exercise on Parris Island. Six of the men drowned, but Berman was able to get an acquittal on the most serious charges. In 1969, Berman was part of the defense team of Sirhan Sirhan, the assassin of Robert F. Kennedy. Berman received criticism for defending an avowed anti-Zionist but countered his critics by stating that he was defending Sirhan's rights and not his beliefs.

Notes

References

External links
"Milestones: Jul. 20, 1981". Time. July 20, 1981.

1902 births
1981 deaths
United States Army Air Forces personnel of World War II
Recipients of the Distinguished Flying Cross (United States)
20th-century American lawyers
Jewish American attorneys
Jewish American military personnel
Criminal defense lawyers
Assassination of Robert F. Kennedy
United States Army Air Forces officers